Helena Rubinstein portrait prize, also known as "Boans – Helena Rubinstein portrait prize", was an annual prize of £300 for portraiture by an Australian artist, awarded by the Helena Rubinstein Foundation (disbanded 2011), and mostly staged at the Claude Hotchin Gallery in Western Australia. It is likely that the prize ceased in 1966, but there is a reference to Robert Juniper winning in 1976 with "Portrait of Rose"

List of Winners
1958: Frank Hodgkinson
1960: Charles Blackman (another reference has Romola Clifton)
1961: William Boissevain
1962:  Margaret Olley
1963: Vladas Meskenas with a double portrait of Weaver Hawkins and his wife.
1964: Judy Cassab for a portrait of art collector Oscar Edwards
1965: Judy Cassab
1966: J. Carington Smith

References 

Awards established in 1958
Australian art awards